Ridgecrest is an unincorporated community in eastern Buncombe County, North Carolina, United States, off Interstate 40/U.S. Route 70. The community is part of the Asheville Metropolitan Statistical Area.  It is home to Ridgecrest Conference Center (Established 1907), Camp Ridgecrest  for Boys (established 1929) and Camp Crestridge  for Girls (established 1955). All three facilities are operated by the newly founded Ridgecrest Foundation and are affiliated with the Southern Baptist Convention. The conference center and summer camps were purchased by the Ridgecrest Foundation on December 30, 2020. Both summer camps are run under the direction of Phil Berry.

Geography
Ridgecrest is located at coordinates , approximately 1.91 miles east-northeast of Black Mountain, 6.38 miles west-northwest of Old Fort, 6.37 miles northeast of Swannanoa, 15 miles east-northeast of Asheville and 367 miles southwest of Washington, D.C.  The ZIP Code for Ridgecrest is 28770.

References

Unincorporated communities in North Carolina
Unincorporated communities in Buncombe County, North Carolina
Asheville metropolitan area
Populated places established in 1929